Susanty Priscilla Adresina Manuhutu (born 7 January 1974) is an Indonesian super model, architect and engineer who was crowned Puteri Indonesia 1995, She represented Indonesia at the Miss Universe 1995 pageant and ended-up won "Miss Clairol Herbal Essences" award. She is the first and the only eastern Indonesian women who was crowned Puteri Indonesia, where she represented her parents hometown Maluku at Puteri Indonesia 1995.

Personal life
Susanty was born in Jakarta, Indonesia, on 7 January 1974 to a Moluccan family background, where she also spend her childhood in Ambon, Maluku. She holds a bachelor's degree on architecture from Christian University of Indonesia in Jakarta, Indonesia. She work as a model and being the brand ambassador of Sunsilk hair shampoo and conditioner.

On 30 December 1997, She is married to American businessman Haries Alexander Crabtree in Amankila by Aman Resorts - Bali. In 1999 besides being a full-time mother, she work as the professional engineering on Conoco and ConocoPhillips, now She is currently work as the Corporate Communications Manager for Chevron Corporation Indonesia, allowing her to travel around Jakarta in Indonesia, Atyrau in Kazakhstan, San Francisco and Pittsburgh in United States.

Pageantry

Puteri Indonesia 1995
At the age of 25, Susanty started her foray at the world of pageantry by representing her home province of Maluku in the Puteri Indonesia 1995 pageant, and was crowned on 11 April 1995 in the Jakarta Convention Center, the finale night was attended by Miss Universe 1994, Sushmita Sen of India.

Miss Universe 1995
Susanty represented Indonesia in Miss Universe 1995 was held on 12 May 1995 at the Windhoek Country Club Resort in Windhoek, Namibia. and was the first Puteri Indonesian winner to represent Indonesia in Miss Universe history, during the competition Susanty ended-up won "Miss Clairol Herbal Essences" special award by sponsor Clairol and Herbal Essences.

See also

 Puteri Indonesia
 Miss Universe 1995
 Alya Rohali

References

External links
 Official Puteri Indonesia Official Website
 Official Miss Universe Official Website
 

Living people
1974 births
Puteri Indonesia winners
Puteri Indonesia contestants
Miss Universe 1995 contestants
Indonesian beauty pageant winners
Indonesian female models
Indonesian activists
Indonesian people of Dutch descent
Moluccan people
Indo people
People from Jakarta